The Peace Union of Finland is a Finnish organization in support of peace and disarmament. Representing the interests of several peace associations in Finland, it furthers its goals by lobbying Finnish and European authorities and acting as the Finnish member of the International Peace Bureau. The Peace Union was founded in 1920 although an organization with the same name existed from 1907 to 1913.

References

Peace organisations based in Finland
Organizations established in 1920
1920 establishments in Finland
Organisations based in Helsinki